Carboxylesterase 3 is an enzyme that in humans is encoded by the CES3 gene.

Function 

Carboxylesterase 3 is a member of a large multigene family.  The enzymes encoded by these genes are responsible for the hydrolysis of ester- and amide-bond-containing drugs such as cocaine and heroin.  They also hydrolyze long-chain fatty acid esters and thioesters.  The specific function of this enzyme has not yet been determined; however, it is speculated that carboxylesterases may play a role in lipid metabolism and/or the blood–brain barrier system.

References

Further reading

EC 3.1.1